"Love Is on Our Side" is a song by the CEDM duo Capital Kings. It was released in the iTunes Store on June 7, 2017.

Composition 
The song features heavily layered EDM synths, and Cole Walowac offers no vocals Love Is on Our Side.

Music video 
The music video was released on YouTube on June 17, 2017, and was both shot and directed by Luke Schoenhals.

Reception 
The song has had somewhat favorable reception, being described as good but not up to par with the "high bar set" by previous singles in their discography. It did well commercially, charting in several Billboard charts.

Track listing 
Digital download

 "Love Is on Our Side" – 3:19

Charts

Release history

References 

2017 songs
2017 singles
Capital Kings songs